Agonidium amplipenne is a species of ground beetle in the subfamily Platyninae. It was described by Gestro in 1895.

References

amplipenne
Beetles described in 1895